Holding Nothing Back is the third Christian music album by Tim Hughes, which was released on April 3, 2007. It the single "Happy Day".

Track listing 
All songs written by Tim Hughes, except where noted.

 "Happy Day" (Tim Hughes, Ben Cantelon) - 3:23
 "The Highest and the Greatest" (Tim Hughes, Nick Herbert) - 5:32
 "Everything" - 4:30
 "Holding Nothing Back" - 3:44
 "Clinging to the Cross" [featuring Brooke Fraser] - 5:16
 "Almighty God" - 3:35
 "God of Justice" - 7:00
 "Out of the Darkness" (Rachel Hughes, Tim Hughes) - 3:27
 "Centre of It All" - 4:31
 "Living for Your Glory" (Rachel Hughes, Tim Hughes) - 4:27
 "Take the World" - 3:59

References

External links

Tim Hughes albums
2007 albums
Survivor Records albums
Sparrow Records albums